Antonio Talbot (May 29, 1900 – September 25, 1980) was a Canadian politician from Quebec.  He once served as interim leader of the Union Nationale.

Background

He was born on May 29, 1900, in Saint-Pierre-de-la-Rivière-du-Sud, Quebec, near Montmagny, and was an attorney.

Member of the legislature

Talbot won a by-election in 1938 and became the Union Nationale member for the district of Chicoutimi.  He was re-elected to seven straight terms in 1939, 1944, 1948, 1952, 1956, 1960 and 1962.

Cabinet Member

He was also a Cabinet minister from 1944 to 1960 under former Premiers Maurice Duplessis, Paul Sauve and Antonio Barrette.

Party Leader

He replaced Yves Prévost as interim UN leader and leader of the Opposition after the latter had served in those capacities for a few months following the resignation of former Premier Antonio Barrette from the UN leadership.

In September 1961, Daniel Johnson Sr. was elected as the new leader of the Union Nationale, thereby replacing interim party leader Talbot as the leader of the Opposition.

Retirement

Talbot resigns his seat to the legislature in 1965.  He died on September 25, 1980.

See also
Politics of Quebec
List of Quebec general elections
List of Quebec leaders of the Opposition
Timeline of Quebec history

References

1900 births
1980 deaths
Lawyers in Quebec
People from Chaudière-Appalaches
Union Nationale (Quebec) MNAs
20th-century Canadian lawyers
Université Laval alumni